Oleg Dmitriyevich Kornaukhov (born 14 January 1975) is a Russian football official and a former player. He is the director of PFC CSKA Moscow academy.

Honours
 Russian Premier League runner-up: 1998.
 Russian Premier League bronze: 1999.
 Russian Cup winner:1993, 2002.
 Russian Cup runner-up: 2000.
 Top 33 players year-end list: 1998, 1999.

International career
Kornaukhov played his only game for Russia so far on 18 November 1998 in a friendly against Brazil. Russia lost 1–5 and Kornaukhov scored the only goal from a penalty kick.

Post-playing career
On 18 December 2018, he was appointed the director of academy for PFC CSKA Moscow.

References

External links
 Profile 
 

1975 births
Footballers from Moscow
Living people
Russian footballers
Association football defenders
Russia international footballers
Russia under-21 international footballers
FC Torpedo Moscow players
FC Torpedo-2 players
FC Shinnik Yaroslavl players
PFC CSKA Moscow players
FC Moscow players
FC Kuban Krasnodar players
FC Akhmat Grozny players
Russian Premier League players
FC FShM Torpedo Moscow players
FC Sportakademklub Moscow players